The 2018 European Pool Championships was a professional pool championship that took place at the NH Hotel Koningshof, in Veldhoven, Netherlands. The event played between 19–31 July 2018 was a part of the European Pool Championships; and saw events for men, women, wheelchair competitors, youth and seniors across four pool disciplines: Straight Pool, 8-Ball, 9-Ball, and 10-Ball.

The event was the largest pool event ever held in Europe, with sixty tables built exclusively for the event.

Tournament overview
The European Championship 2018 was held at the NH Hotel Koningshof in Veldhoven, Netherlands. In a hall of the hotel 60 pool tables were built. Veldhoven held the event for the second time, having hosted it in 2005. The event hosted over 550 players from 37 countries, the most of any European championships.

All competitions were played in the double elimination knockout system until only a certain number of participants remained and then continued in the knockout system. The individual competitions of the men were played in the round of the last 64 in knockout mode (straight pool: round of the last 32), in the women from the round of 16, and the wheelchair users from the quarter-finals. The team competitions were held from the round of 16 (men) or semi-final (ladies) in the knockout system.

The online news channel Kozoom streamed all matches of the European Championship live in up to 60 channels.

Results 
Jouni Tähti was the most successful player at the championships, becoming the first wheelchair player to win all three disciplines in a single championships. The following is a list of winners to semi-finalists for all events through the championships.

Men's

Straight Pool

10-Ball

8-Ball

9-Ball

Team

References

External links
 Official website

European Pool Championships
2018 in cue sports
2018 in Dutch sport
International sports competitions hosted by the Netherlands
July 2018 sports events in the Netherlands
Sports competitions in North Brabant
Sport in Veldhoven